Edmonton Regiment may refer to:

 Edmonton Royal Rifle Regiment, a militia unit from Middlesex, England from 1853–1881
 The Loyal Edmonton Regiment (4th Battalion, Princess Patricia's Canadian Light Infantry), a Primary Reserve unit of the Canadian Armed Forces